The Lebanese Premier League 2007/08 season is the 47th season in the Lebanese Premier League. The Championship was decided on the final matchday, when Al-Ansar and Nejmeh tied each other 1–1 while Al Ahed defeated Tadamon Sour 2–1 to win its first championship title. Striker Mohammed Ghaddar from Nejmeh won the top scorer award, having found the net 22 times.

Due to the 2008 unrest in Lebanon, the games where postponed for one month. Thus the league finished in June 2008 instead of May 2008 as scheduled.

Final standings

Relegation and promotion 

Relegated to 2008–09 Second Division:
Al-Irshad
Al-Ahli Sidon
Promoted from 2007–08 Second Division:
Salam Zgharta (champions)
Shabab Al-Ghazieh

Top scorers 

This is a list of top scorers of the 2007–08 season. Mohammed Ghaddar is currently leading.

References 

Lebanese Premier League seasons
Leb
1
2007–08 Lebanese Premier League